The 2012 Constellation Cup was the 3rd Constellation Cup series played between Australia and New Zealand. The series, also known as the New World Series, featured three netball test matches, played in September 2012. The Australia team was coached by Lisa Alexander and captained by Natalie von Bertouch. New Zealand were coached by Waimarama Taumaunu and captained by Casey Williams and Laura Langman. New Zealand won the series for the first time. After winning the opening test, New Zealand clinched the series after winning the second test. The series finished 2–1 to New Zealand after Australia won the final test.

Squads

Australia

Milestones
 On 20 September 2012 in the second test, Catherine Cox made her 100th senior appearance for Australia. Cox became only the fourth Australia netball international, after Vicki Wilson, Sharelle McMahon and Liz Ellis, to reach the century mark.

New Zealand

 

Notes
  Casey Williams was initially named New Zealand captain. However she missed all three tests because of injury. Laura Langman captained the team for the series.

Matches

New World Netball Series

First test

Second test

Third test

References

2012
2012 in New Zealand netball
2012 in Australian netball
September 2012 sports events in New Zealand
September 2012 sports events in Australia